The British ice hockey league champions are the winners of the regular season of the highest ice hockey league in the United Kingdom, currently the Elite Ice Hockey League. Previously, the highest league has been the British National League (1954–60), the Premier Division (1983–96) and the Ice Hockey Superleague (1996–2003). 

While the regular season winners are recognised as the British League champions, the British champions are regarded as the winners of the end-of-season playoffs, for which the league provides qualification and seeding.

History

Prior to the formation of the British National League, England and Scotland each had their own competitions. The English League was founded in 1931 with the Scottish National League being formed a year later. The majority of English League clubs left to form the English National League in 1935, leading the disbandment of the English League at the end of the 1935–36 season. The Scottish National League and English National League both continued until 1954. In that year the decision was taken to amalgamate the two leagues into one. The new competition initially fielded 12 sides in its inaugural season, four from England and eight from Scotland. The Dunfermline Vikings withdrew from the league in early 1955 and at the end of the season six of the seven remaining Scottish sides withdrew, leaving the league with five members. This fell to four following the closure of Harringay Arena in 1958 but increased again to five in 1959 following the admission of Streatham. The league was disbanded following the 1959–60 season.

Following the closure of the British National League, no league competition took place in the United Kingdom for the next six years. Instead clubs, some of which did not have a home rink, participated in rink tournaments. In 1966 the Northern League was formed. This league was made up of teams from Scotland and North East England and was the country's only league for four years. The Southern League was established in 1970 and was divided into the English League North and Inter-City League in 1978. The British Hockey League was formed in 1982 with the Premier Division being launched a season later. There has been a British league continuously since then, although there have been three different organisations and the number of teams taking part has varied from twelve in 1993–94, 1994–95 and 2017–18 to five in 2002–03. The current Elite Ice Hockey League was established in 2003.

There has been a British league competition for 42 seasons and 16 teams have won the league championship. The most successful club is the Sheffield Steelers, who have won the championship on nine occasions, followed by the Cardiff Devils (6), the Belfast Giants and now-defunct Durham Wasps (5 each) and the Coventry Blaze (4). The Nottingham Panthers, the only club to have played in all 42 seasons, have won the title twice (additionally Nottingham were English champions twice before the British National League was formed). The Durham Wasps, Murrayfield Racers, Cardiff Devils, Sheffield Steelers and Coventry Blaze are the only sides to have successfully defended a title.

Champions

1954–60: British National League

1982–96: Premier Division

1996–2003: Ice Hockey Superleague

2003–present: Elite Ice Hockey League

Total titles won

Teams in bold are current Elite Ice Hockey League members. Teams in italics are teams which play outside of the Elite Ice Hockey League. The remaining teams are defunct, although Dundee, Edinburgh (home of the Murrayfield Racers) and Manchester still have their own ice hockey teams.

Total titles won by Home Nation

Each of the four constituent nations of the United Kingdom have had at least one team who have been British champions. Teams from England have been league champions on 24 occasions, Scottish sides five times, while Welsh side Cardiff Devils and the Northern Ireland based Belfast Giants are the only sides from their parts of the United Kingdom to win the league.

Notes

References

Ice hockey in the United Kingdom
Ice Hockey Superleague
Elite Ice Hockey League